Miroslav Keresteš (born 30 July 1989) is a Slovak football defender who last played for Partizán Bardejov.

Club career

FC Zbrojovka Brno
He made his professional debut for Zbrojovka Brno against Sparta Prague on 24 February 2014.

References

External links
 
 FC Zbrojovka Brno profile
 Eurofotbal profile

 

1989 births
Living people
Sportspeople from Prešov
Slovak footballers
Slovak expatriate footballers
Association football defenders
1. FC Tatran Prešov players
FC Lokomotíva Košice players
SFC Opava players
FC Zbrojovka Brno players
FK Mladá Boleslav players
FC Vysočina Jihlava players
Partizán Bardejov players
Czech First League players
2. Liga (Slovakia) players
Expatriate footballers in the Czech Republic
Slovak expatriate sportspeople in the Czech Republic